Jutland Series is the highest division for men organized by the regional association DBU Jylland and one of the fifth-highest divisions overall in the Danish football league system. The Jutland Association Football Championship was introduced in 1902. At the introduction of the championship, the tournament was placed at the top of the Danish football league system, but has since been moved to its current status as the fifth best level in Danish football, after a short period as the sixth best level, below the Denmark Series at the fourth level.

The division has changed its name on numerous occasions. It has previously been known as A-rækken (up until 1921/22; or JBUs A-række, Række A) and Mesterskabsrækken (1922/23-1950/51; or JBUs Mesterskabsrække to distinguish it from the other regional leagues; unofficially shortened to Mesterrækken), before settling with the current name of Jyllandsserien in 1951, eventually becoming Jyllandsserien for Herrer (or Herre Jyllandsserien, shortened to JS) to distinguish it from the women's corresponding regional league, that was introduced in the 1970s.

Jutland Championship winners

A-Rækken

Mesterskabsrækken

Jyllandsserien

Jyllandsserien JM Final

Jyllandsserien

References 

Denmark
5
Sports leagues established in 1902
1902 establishments in Denmark
Jutland Football Championship